The 2013 Texas State Bobcats football team represented Texas State University in the 2013 NCAA Division I FBS football season. The Bobcats were led by head coach Dennis Franchione, in his third year, and played their home games at Bobcat Stadium. This was the Bobcats first season in the Sun Belt Conference, and it was the first year the Bobcats were eligible to win a conference title or attend a bowl game after their 2-year FCS to FBS transition.

Schedule

Game summaries

Southern Miss

Sources:

Prairie View A&M

Sources:

Texas Tech

Sources:

Wyoming

Sources:

Louisiana-Lafayette

Sources:

Louisiana-Monroe

Sources:

Georgia State

Sources:

South Alabama

Sources:

Idaho

Sources:

Arkansas State

Sources:

WKU

Sources:

Troy

Sources:

References

Texas State
Texas State Bobcats football seasons
Texas State Bobcats football